Model Railways and Locomotive Magazine was an early British magazine devoted to railway modelling. It existed between January 1909 and September 1918 when it was renamed Models

History and profile
The first volume was published in January 1909. The founder was Henry Greenly. It was edited by Henry Greenly and W J Bassett-Lowke, who are well known in the history of model railways. Henry Greenly was a prolific author, while Bassett-Lowke went on to found a model railway manufacturing company which still exists as part of the Hornby company.

Model Railways and Locomotive Magazine was published on a monthly basis. The magazine was informative on railway lore and carried many construction articles. It ceased publication in 1916.

References

Model Railways and Locomotives bound volumes 1 to 12 1909

Monthly magazines published in the United Kingdom
Defunct magazines published in the United Kingdom
Magazines established in 1909
Magazines disestablished in 1916
Rail transport modelling publications
Rail transport magazines published in the United Kingdom